A list of the Minnesota State High School League sponsored conferences:

A-C

D-G

H-L

M

N

O-R

S

T-Z

† - Cooperative program from multiple schools

Independents

Basketball
Ascension AcademyBemidji High SchoolCambridge ChristianCampbell-Tintah High SchoolCannon Valley High SchoolCircle of LifeChesterton AcademyCHOFChristian LifeClearbrook-GonvickCloquet ChristianCristo Rey JesuitE.C.H.O.Bug-O-Nay-Gee-Shig SchoolDuluth East High SchoolElmore AcademyFaith Christian AcademyFond du Lac OjibweFourth Baptist Christian SchoolHope AcademyHope ChristianGood ShepherdGrand Rapids High SchoolGroves AcademyImmanuel Lutheran SchoolLake RegionLakeview Christian AcademyLearning for LeadershipMesabi AcademyMetroTech Career AcademyMinnetonka Christian AcademyMounds Park AcademyNay Ah Shing SchoolsMetro North ABEPark ChristianRapids ChristianRed Lake CountyRivers ChristianRochester Home SchoolSacred HeartSaint Paul Preparatory SchoolSouth MetroSparta Home SchoolUnidaleValley Christian School

Football
Columbia Heights High SchoolE.C.H.O.Elmore AcademyMetro Deaf School, St. PaulMN Academy for the Deaf, FaribaultRed Lake High SchoolSpectrum High School, Elk RiverWest Lutheran High School, Plymouth

Hockey
Achiever Academy, Vadnais HeightsBenilde-St. Margaret's School, St. Louis ParkBreckenridge/Wahpeton†Dodge County†East High School, DuluthEly Memorial High SchoolLa Crescent High SchoolNorth Shore†Lourdes High SchoolHighland Park High School, St. Paul

Former conferences
North Suburban
Metro Alliance
Circle 8
Conferences